Number 33 Squadron of the Royal Air Force operates the Westland Puma HC.2 from RAF Benson, Oxfordshire.

History

First World War
No. 33 Squadron of the Royal Flying Corps was formed from part of No. 12 Squadron at Filton on 12 January 1916. For the remainder of the First World War the squadron was employed for Home Defence in Lincolnshire, guarding against German airship raids against northern England, being first equipped with Royal Aircraft Factory BE.2s, these being supplemented with Royal Aircraft Factory FE.2s. Its headquarters were at Gainsborough, with its flights based on three stations: RAF Scampton (A Flight), RAF Kirton in Lindsey (B Flight) and RAF Elsham Wolds (C Flight). The FE.2s were replaced by Bristol Fighters in June 1918, which were in turn replaced by night fighter Avro 504s in August. The squadron did not destroy any enemy airships, despite a number of interceptions and was disbanded in June 1919.

Between the wars
The Squadron was reformed at RAF Netheravon on 1 March 1929 as a bomber unit, equipped first with the Hawker Horsley and in February 1930, it became the first squadron to receive the new Hawker Hart, an aircraft faster than the RAF's fighter aircraft. In 1935, as part of Britain's response to the Second Italo-Abyssinian War, the unit moved to Egypt, taking part in  air policing in Palestine.  In February 1938, the squadron re-equipped with Gloster Gladiators, changing role to a fighter squadron, although at first it continued in support of British ground forces in Palestine.

Second World War

With the exception of a time in Greece and Crete in 1941, 33 Sqn remained in the Middle East for most of World War II. Equipped initially with the Gloster Gladiators they had used in Palestine, the Squadron claimed its first victories of the Second World War on 14 June 1940, while supporting the British capture of Fort Capuzzo, when the squadron shot down an Italian  Caproni Ca 310 and a Fiat CR.32. It suffered its first losses of the war five days later in a combat with Fiat CR.42 Falcos, with one Gladiator being shot down in exchange for two Fiats. The squadron re-equipped with Hurricanes in October 1940, allowing it to intercept the Italian SM.79 bombers, which were faster than the Gladiator.

It was withdrawn from the desert fighting in January 1941, in order to help resist the Italian invasion of Greece. From 12 March, Pat Pattle, the leading Commonwealth flying ace, was in command until he was killed in action on 20 April. The squadron was involved in heavy fighting following the German intervention, and had to be withdrawn to Crete on 27 April. Due to continuing heavy losses, the squadron had to amalgamate with No. 80 Squadron RAF and the ground personnel fought hand-to-hand with German paratroopers to protect the airfield. The remnants of 33 Squadron retired to Egypt by the end of May after the Battle of Crete. The Squadron returned to support the Army in the Western Desert, including at the Battle of El Alamein, trading its Hurricanes for Supermarine Spitfires in December 1943.

Returning to the UK in 1944 for Operation Overlord (the Allied invasion of Normandy), the squadron flew the Spitfire IX F from RAF Lympne in Air Defence of Great Britain, though under the operational control of RAF Second Tactical Air Force (2nd TAF). It flew fighter support on D-Day (6 June 1944), then moved to France with 2nd TAF in October 1944, when it concentrated on ground-attack operations. It re-equipped with the Hawker Tempest in December, returning to action from Gilze-Rijen in February 1945, flying fighter sweeps in North West Europe. The squadron remained in Germany until 1949.

Post War operations
From 1949 to 1970, 33 Squadron spent much of its time in the Far East, based at Kai Tak, Hong Kong, until sent to Kuala Lumpur in Malaya, flying their Tempests in ground attack missions against Communist guerrillas during the Malayan Emergency. It re-equipped with twin-engined de Havilland Hornets in 1951, disbanding in March 1955, having flown 6,150 sorties during its stay in Malaya.

On 15 December 1955, it reformed as a night fighter squadron flying de Havilland Venom NF.2s from RAF Driffield, being disbanded on 3 June 1957 and reformed on 1 October, by renumbering No. 264 Squadron, another night fighter squadron operating Gloster Meteor NF.14s from RAF Leeming. It re-equipped with Gloster Javelins in April 1958, at RAF Middleton St George, being disbanded again on 18 November 1962. A number of  types were operated during several disbandments and reformations throughout the late 1950s and early 1960s. In April 1965, No. 33 Squadron became a Bloodhound surface-to-air missile unit based at Butterworth in Malaya, being disbanded on 30 January 1970.

The squadron reformed on 14 June 1971 at RAF Odiham as the RAF's first Westland Puma squadron it took part in the Gulf War of 1991, the Kosovo War in the late 1990s, relief operations during the flooding in Mozambique in 2000 and NATO operations in Bosnia in the early 2000s.

On 8 August 2007, the crash of No. 33 Squadron Puma HC.1 ZA934 left three personnel dead out of twelve on board in Catterick Garrison. The inquest coroner called No. 33 Squadron "a sloppy outfit", that allowed an unqualified crew to operate the helicopter. A court-martial of the co-pilot stated that "the officers on this board are shocked at the lack of professional standards displayed by those responsible for the aircraft." The squadron was deployed to Iraq as part of Operation Telic in 2009.

The Puma HC.1 was withdrawn from service and was replaced by the Puma HC.2 in December 2012.

On 11 October 2015, one personnel member of the squadron was killed in an accident in Kabul, Afghanistan, whilst landing at the NATO Training and Support Mission HQ. A Ministry of Defence spokesman said the crash was "an accident and not the result of insurgent activity". The pilot was named a day later, and was repatriated back to the UK on the 20th. The Flight Lieutenant's CO commented saying "He died tragically doing a job he loved and flying an aircraft he had personally invested so much time developing. A loving husband, his loyalty and devotion to his friends, work colleagues and the job was unequalled and his memory and contribution will live on." A post mortem found he died of multiple injuries at an inquest. The inquest was adjourned indefinitely until the conclusion of separate inquiries being undertaken by the Ministry of Defence were completed.

Previous aircraft

Memorials

There is a Royal Air Force (RAF) memorial in Crete to the airmen of 30 and 33 Squadrons who died during the battle of Crete. The memorial is located behind the roadside hedge between Maleme and Tavronitis overlooking the  Iron Bridge across the Tavronitis River and the end of Maleme Airport runway.

See also
List of RAF squadrons

Notes

Bibliography

Official Squadron page on the RAF Website.  Retrieved 2008-06-25
 Ken Delve, D-Day: The Air Battle, London: Arms & Armour Press, 1994, .
 Halley, James J. The Squadrons of the Royal Air Force. Tonbridge, Kent, UK: Air Britain (Historians) Ltd., 1980. .
 Moyes, Philip. Bomber Squadrons of the RAF and Their Aircraft.  London, Macdonald and Jane's, 1964, Second revised edition 1976. .

 Rawlings J.D.R. "History of No. 33 Squadron". Air Pictorial, September 1970, Vol. 32 No. 9. pp. 327–330.
 Rawlings, John D.R. Fighter Squadrons of the RAF and Their Aircraft. London, Macdonald and Jane's, 1969, Second revised edition 1976. .

External links

 No 33 Squadron

033 Squadron
033 Squadron
Military units and formations established in 1916
1916 establishments in the United Kingdom
Military units and formations in Mandatory Palestine in World War II